Luule Viilma (6 April 1950 – 20 January 2002) was an Estonian doctor, esotericist and practitioner of alternative medicine. She is best known for her parapsychological book series Teaching of Survival (Ellujäämise õpetus) which outlined her supposed methods of healing by thought.

Biography
Viilma was born in Jõgeva and graduated from the Tartu State University in 1974 as a specialist of gynæcology.  She practiced in Rapla Hospital and Haapsalu Hospital.  In 1991, she started a private gynæcology practice.  In the same year, she became acquainted with parapsychology, which led her to write extensively about supposed "thought healing" methods.

Viilma died in 2002 in a car crash near Kabli.

References

External links
 Luuleviilma.ee

1950 births
2002 deaths
Estonian gynaecologists
Esotericists
Parapsychologists
Estonian women physicians
People from Jõgeva
University of Tartu alumni
Road incident deaths in Estonia